Jkvr. Machteld van Foreest (born 22 August 2007) is a Dutch chess player. She has won several Dutch Youth Championships, including the open under-12 division in 2017 and 2018, the open under-14 division in 2018, and the girls' under-10 division in 2014 at age six. She finished in joint third place at the 2019 Dutch Women's Chess Championship at age 12. She finished in joint third place and fifth overall in the girls' under-12 division at the 2019 World Cadets Chess Championship. Van Foreest has a peak FIDE rating of 2330.

Van Foreest grew up in a chess family in which her father taught her and all five of her brothers to play chess. Her two oldest brothers Jorden and Lucas both hold the title of Grandmaster (GM), and her twin brother Nanne also plays competitively. Van Foreest's great-great-grandfather Arnold was a three-time Dutch chess champion, as was Arnold's brother Dirk. Van Foreest began playing chess at age four. She was the highest-rated girl age 12 or under in 2018.  In 2022, she became the youngest ever Dutch Women's Champion after beating Anne Haast for the title.

References

2007 births
Living people
Dutch chess players
Sportspeople from Groningen (city)
Van Foreest family